Pavo Dadić (born 28 June 1969) is a Bosnian retired football player. A Croat, he decided to play for Bosnia.

International career
Dadić made his debut for Bosnia and Herzegovina in an April 1996 friendly match against Albania and has earned a total of 10 caps, scoring no goals. His final international was a September 1997 World Cup qualification against Slovenia.

References

External links

Profile - NFSBIH

1969 births
Living people
Croats of Bosnia and Herzegovina
Association football midfielders
Bosnia and Herzegovina footballers
Bosnia and Herzegovina international footballers
NK Zadar players
NK Čelik Zenica players
NK Žepče players
Croatian Football League players
Premier League of Bosnia and Herzegovina players
Bosnia and Herzegovina expatriate footballers
Expatriate footballers in Croatia
Bosnia and Herzegovina expatriate sportspeople in Croatia